Beckett–Manrod House is a registered historic building near Hamilton, Ohio, listed in the National Register on 1977-11-11. The house was built by farmer Robert Beckett in 1836. It exemplifies the transition from Federal to Greek Revival architecture in rural Ohio. Jake Manrod acquired the house in 1918.

Historic uses 
Single Dwelling

Notes 

National Register of Historic Places in Butler County, Ohio
Houses on the National Register of Historic Places in Ohio
Houses in Butler County, Ohio